Christian Academy is a private, co-educational Christian school in Honolulu, Hawaii. Grades are from pre-K through 12.

Christian Academy is accredited by Association of Christian Schools International and has approximately 250 students.

History

External links

Christian schools in Hawaii
Schools in Hawaii